James Russell Patton (born September 29, 1933 – December 22, 1972) was an American professional football player who was a defensive back in the National Football League (NFL) for the New York Giants. He was a five-time Pro Bowl selection and five-time first-team All-Pro. Patton played college football at the University of Mississippi and was drafted in the eighth round of the 1955 NFL Draft. 

On December 22, 1972, Patton was killed in an automobile accident near Villa Rica, Georgia. He was driving alone in his car when he was struck by an oncoming vehicle while attempting to pass another car. He was driving to Virginia to see his sister who was dying of cancer as reported by his sons.

Patton is second in Giants history for most interceptions. When he retired, he was one of only seven players with fifty career interceptions.  He is one of nine defensive backs to have been named a First-team All-Pro in five seasons, however Patton is the only one to have not been inducted into the Pro Football Hall of Fame. The Professional Football Researchers Association named Patton to the "PRFA Hall of Very Good" class of 2010.

References

1933 births
1972 deaths
American football defensive backs
Ole Miss Rebels football players
New York Giants players
Eastern Conference Pro Bowl players
Sportspeople from Greenville, Mississippi
Road incident deaths in Georgia (U.S. state)